Loch Sgadabhagh or Loch Scadavay is a body of water on the island of  North Uist, Scotland. The name may be of Old Norse derivation meaning "lake of tax bay" although if so, the reason is obscure. Loch Sgadabhagh is the largest loch by area on North Uist although Loch Obisary has about twice the volume.

Geography
According to Murray and Pullar (1908) "there is probably no other loch in Britain which approaches Loch Scadavay in irregularity and complexity of outline. It is an extraordinary labyrinth of narrow channels, bays, promontories and islands" The loch is crossed by the main A867 road and the northern and southern portions are "connected by such a small channel under the road that in time of flood the south loch may temporarily rise some feet higher than the other, though normally they are at the same level".

Two very short streams enter Loch Scadavay, conveying the overflow of Loch nan Eun and Loch a' Bhuird. The rivulet Garbh-Abhuinn, the most considerable stream in this part of the island, flows eastward from the north portion of the loch to Loch Garbh-Abhuinn, which drains through Loch Skealtar and Loch nan Geireann into the sea via Loch Maddy.

The shoreline is in parts of peat, stones, gravel with boulders, or rock.

Islands
There are numerous islands in the loch of which the largest is Eilean Dubh Mòr. Some of the islands have been the sites of dùns or crannogs and in some cases would have been connected to the shore by narrow causeways.

Once such, which lies between the promontories Rubh' a' Chlachain and Aird Smeilis, is described as a walled islet that is connected to the shore by an S-shaped causeway. According to Beveridge (1911) there is a gateway "a little east from the landing point of the causeway, which leads to a guard-chamber built against the inner side of the fort wall. There is also a  semicircle of stones that forms a small harbour on the west side of the island.

The presence of these islets mean that there is no open water broader than about  anywhere on the loch. Small boulders break the surface of the shallower sections making navigation difficult.

References 
 Murray, Sir John and Pullar, Laurence (1908) Bathymetrical Survey of the Fresh-Water Lochs of Scotland, 1897-1909. London; Royal Geographical Society.

Notes

North Uist
Sgadabhagh